FERM and PDZ domain containing 2 is a protein that in humans is encoded by the FRMPD2 gene.

Function

This gene encodes a peripheral membrane protein and is located in a region of chromosome 10q that contains a segmental duplication. This copy of the gene is full-length and is in the telomeric duplicated region. Two other more centromerically proximal copies of the gene are partial and may represent pseudogenes. This full-length gene appears to function in the establishment and maintenance of cell polarization. The protein is recruited to cell-cell junctions in an E-cadherin-dependent manner, and is selectively localized at the basolateral membrane in polarized epithelial cells. Alternative splicing results in multiple transcript variants.

References

Further reading